The 1929–30 Segunda División season saw 10 teams participate in the second flight Spanish league. Alavés was promoted to Primera División. Cultural Leonesa was relegated to Tercera División.

Teams

Stadia and locations

League table

Results

External links
LFP website

Segunda División seasons
2
Spain